This is a list of those men and women who have been royal consorts of the Kingdom of Navarre. Because the laws of Navarre did not prohibit women from inheriting the crown, on a number of occasions, the Kingdom was inherited or transmitted via heiresses. Thus, whilst most of the royal consorts were women, who held the title of queen consort, several were men, who by their marriages held the title of king, and who are given regnal designations in the lists of Navarrese kings and queens regnant.

Most of these men, although granted power through marriage rather than through inheritance, nonetheless were significant or dominant in their marriages and the rule of the country; indeed, one king by marriage, John II of Navarre (who would late in life also become John II of Aragon by rightful inheritance), husband of Blanche I of Navarre, refused to surrender the crown following her death to their son, Charles of Viana, the rightful heir to the Kingdom, instead retaining the power for himself.

Vicissitudes of the crown

From 1285 to 1328, the crowns of Navarre and France were united by virtue of the marriage of Joan I of Navarre, queen regnant of Navarre and queen consort of France, to King Philip IV of France (who became king-by-marriage of Navarre), and by the succession of their three sons, Louis I/X, Philip II/V, and Charles I/IV. Thus, the wives of these three Kings were Queen-consort of both France and Navarre. However, the inheritance of Navarre by Philip II/V and Charles I/IV following the death of Louis I/X, and his son John I, was, strictly speaking, against the laws of Navarre: that realm did not employ salic law, meaning that the Kingdom should have passed to Jeanne, heiress of Louis, rather than to Philip, the next male heir of Joan I. However, Jeanne being a young child still, and her uncles being of Navarrese blood, she was denied her rights until the death of Charles in 1328, at which point the male line of Joan I died out, and Jeanne was allowed to inherit Navarre. Her husband, Philip of Évreux, became King Philip III of Navarre with his wife due to this.

Thereafter, Navarre on several occasions experienced an extinction of its ruling male line, and consequent absorption or inclusion in the lands of other families. In most cases, the beginning of a new dynasty in Navarre was preceded by the father of the new monarch serving as royal consort—the exception being the De Foix family, none of whom ever served as Navarrese consorts (due to the death of Gaston IV, Count of Foix prior to the inheritance of his wife).

In 1512–13, Upper Navarre, the portion of the Kingdom below the Pyrenees and the independent portion of the Kingdom from which the crown derived, was occupied by Spanish forces under Ferdinand the Catholic, the son of John II, and husband of Germaine de Foix (an heiress of Navarre), driving out the king and queen, John III and Catherine I. Ferdinand was proclaimed King of Navarre by the cortes there; his wife became queen consort of the realm, and thereafter the de facto queens consort of Navarre are identical with the queens consort of Spain. John and Catherine maintained claims to Navarre, which were inherited by their heirs, and their line continued to use the titles of King and Queen of Navarre; however, all that remained to them were the feudal lands they held from the French crown, and they ceased to be monarchs other than by right.

The final dynastic change was the marriage of Joan III to Antoine de Bourbon, an heir to the French throne, and the subsequent succession to the throne of their son, Henry III. He later became King of France as Henry IV, and French and Navarrese queens consort once again become one and the same. However, the Navarrese crown and lands were merged into the French crown in 1620, and thereafter the French queens consort, though honorifically still queens consort of Navarre, ceased to be so in any real sense.

House of Íñiguez (c. 824 – 905)

House of Jiménez (905–1234)

House of Champagne (1234–1284)

House of Capet (1284–1349)

House of Évreux (1328–1441)

House of Trastámara (1425–1479)

House of Albret (1483–1572)

House of Bourbon (1572–1620)

For the later consorts, see the List of French royal consorts and List of Spanish royal consorts

Monarchs of Navarre since 1620 
Henry III of Navarre became Henry IV of France and thereafter the crown of Navarre passed to the kings of France. In 1620, the Kingdom was merged into France, although the French kings continued to use the title King of Navarre until 1791, and it was revived from 1814 to 1830 during the Restoration. In Spain (which is the actual country to where most of the territories of historical Navarre belong), the monarch uses the title King of Navarre as part of his more extended titulary.

See also 
List of Navarrese monarchs
List of Aragonese royal consorts
List of Asturian royal consorts
List of Castilian royal consorts
List of French royal consorts
List of Galician royal consorts
List of Leonese royal consorts
List of Spanish royal consorts
List of consorts of Champagne
List of consorts of Foix

References

Sources

NAVARRE

Lists of queens
 
Navarre